This article is a list of diseases of coffee (Coffea arabica, Coffea canephora).

Fungal diseases

Nematodes, parasitic

Viral diseases

Miscellaneous diseases and disorders
 Leaf miners (moths) - Leucoptera caffeina, Leucoptera coffeella

References
 Extensive details and images, including on coffee rust epidemic, also in French, Spanish and Portuguese
 Common Names of Diseases, The American Phytopathological Society
 Common Names of Plant Diseases, International Society for Molecular Plant-Microbe Interactions

Coffee